"A Game of Pool" is episode 70 of the American television anthology series The Twilight Zone. It originally aired on October 13, 1961, on CBS. According to Rod Serling, it is "the story of the best pool player living and the best pool player dead."

Opening narration

Plot
Pool shark Jesse Cardiff stays after hours at Lister's Pool Room in Chicago, practicing. Jesse bitterly muses that he would be considered the greatest pool player of all time, if it were not for the memory of the late James Howard "Fats" Brown overshadowing him.

He says he would give anything to play one game against Fats, prompting Fats himself to wearily rise from a pool table in the afterlife. He appears in the pool room and offers to play against Jesse, with a wager attached. If Jesse wins, he will be acknowledged as the greatest pool player ever; if he loses, he forfeits his life.

Jesse accepts these conditions and the two begin to play. Throughout the game, Fats laments that Jesse has done nothing with his life but play pool, explaining that he himself lived a full life in addition to becoming a great player. Jesse ignores Fats, convinced that he is just trying to distract him. With one ball left on the table and both men needing to sink it in order to win, Fats misses his shot, and he warns Jesse that he may get more than he bargained for if he wins the game. Jesse sinks the ball and revels in his victory, now secure in his status as the best pool player of all time. Fats thanks Jesse for beating him, leading Jesse to angrily call him a sore loser, before Fats disappears.

Long after his own death, Jesse is summoned from the afterlife to travel to Mason's Pool Hall in Sandusky, Ohio, to play against a challenger. Known even in death as the greatest pool player ever, Jesse has no choice but to face an endless series of challengers until someone beats him and relieves him of his title. Meanwhile Fats has gone fishing, relieved of his obligation.

Closing narration

Remake with alternative ending
George Clayton Johnson's script originally featured an ending in which Jesse loses the game and yet finds himself still alive. Seeing this, Fats explains that he will die "as all second-raters die: you'll be buried and forgotten without me touching you. If you'd beaten me, you'd have lived forever." Fats disappears, while Jesse vows to keep practicing until he is good enough to face the champion again.

The episode was remade in the 1980s version of The Twilight Zone. The remade version featured Esai Morales as Jesse Cardiff and Maury Chaykin as Fats Brown. This version used the original alternate ending that Johnson intended for the original 1961 version.

References
Zicree, Marc Scott: The Twilight Zone Companion. Sillman-James Press, 1982 (second edition)
DeVoe, Bill. (2008). Trivia from The Twilight Zone. Albany, GA: Bear Manor Media. 
Grams, Martin. (2008). The Twilight Zone: Unlocking the Door to a Television Classic. Churchville, MD: OTR Publishing.

External links

1961 American television episodes
The Twilight Zone (1959 TV series season 3) episodes
Cue sports on television
Television episodes written by George Clayton Johnson
Television episodes set in Chicago
Two-handers